The Secret River is a 2005 historical novel by Kate Grenville about an early 19th-century Englishman transported to Australia for theft. The story explores what might have happened when Europeans colonised land already inhabited by Aboriginal people. The book has been compared to Thomas Keneally's The Chant of Jimmie Blacksmith and to Peter Carey's True History of the Kelly Gang for its style and historical theme.

Background
The Secret River was inspired by Grenville's desire to understand the history of her ancestor Solomon Wiseman, who settled on the Hawkesbury River at the area now known as Wisemans Ferry. Her inspiration to understand this came from her taking part in the 28 May 2000 Reconciliation Walk across Sydney Harbour Bridge during which she realised that she didn't know much about the early interactions between the settlers and the Aboriginal people. Initially intended to be a work of non-fiction about Wiseman, the book eventually became a fictional work based on her research into Wiseman but not specifically about Wiseman himself. The novel took five years and twenty drafts to complete.

The novel is dedicated to the Aboriginal people of Australia. It sparked hostility from some historians, including Australian academic Mark McKenna, who published an article in which he criticized Kate Grenville, claiming that Grenville had referred to The Secret River as a "work of history", however, he could not provide a source for the statement. It received a positive response from many Aboriginal people; Grenville has said "they recognise that the book is my act of acknowledgement, my way of saying: this is how I'm sorry".

Adaptations
The Secret River has been adapted for the stage by Andrew Bovell; the play was presented by the Sydney Theatre Company in January 2013 and included in the Edinburgh International Festival in August 2019.

A TV adaptation was made in 2015 by Ruby Entertainment with support from the Australian Broadcasting Corporation and Screen Australia, and was aired in June of that year by ABC TV as a two-part miniseries.

Plot summary
The early life of William Thornhill is one of Dickensian poverty, depredation and criminality.
After a childhood of poverty and petty crime in the slums of London, William Thornhill is sentenced to death for stealing wood, however, in 1806 his sentence is commuted to transportation to New South Wales for the term of his natural life. With his wife Sal and children in tow, he arrives in a harsh land that feels at first like a death sentence. However, there is a way for the convicts to buy freedom and start afresh. Thornhill then gets sent to Sydney on a boat, by himself. After 9 months, Thornhill is finally able to reunite with his family in Australia. Sal becomes Thornhill's master, and Thornhill obtained a ticket of leave, one year later, after he demonstrated good behaviour. His son, Willie is already five years old, and Willie could not recognize his father, after being away from him for so long. Thornhill now also has another son, Richard, whom he called Dick.

During his first night in this new land, Thornhill encounters an Aboriginal man and struggles to communicate with him. The following weeks, Thornhill went to work as a lighterman for Mr. King. Thornhill then brought the alcohol, which he got from Mr. King, back home, to set up his own bar, named the "Pickled Herring." Scabby Bill was a regular customer, who would entertain the customers, by dancing for money.

Three years later, and Thornhill quits his job and works for Thomas Blackwood, a former convict who is attempting to reconcile himself with the place and its people. Blackwood lived on the Hawkesbury River, with his boat, "the Queen". Thornhill also met Smasher Sullivan, a man whose fear of this alien world turns into brutal depravity towards it.

Thornhill soon realises that the Aboriginal people of Australia have a different concept of land ownership, as compared to the white settlers, and notices that many of the Aboriginals were stealing his corn. Thornhill realises that Blackwood has an Aboriginal wife, and son. Shocked, he goes on to tell his wife about it. He also gave the black people names, to tell them apart easily, and renamed some of them as "Whisker Harry", "Long Bob" and "Black Dick". Thornhill was also shocked to see his son, Dick playing with the Aboriginal people, and he beat up Dick. As Thornhill and his family stake their claim on a patch of ground by the river, the battle lines between old and new inhabitants are drawn.

Soon after, Saggity, a friend of Smasher Sullivan was killed after a raid on his farm by Aboriginals, it is Saggity's death that leads to the battle with the Aboriginals. Blackwood tries to stop the fighting, but gets whipped by Smasher. In the battle between the settlers and the Aboriginals many casualties are sustained on both sides, Whisker Harry kills Sullivan, while he gets shot in the stomach, and long Jack gets shot in the head.
Though Thornhill is a loving husband and a good father, his interactions with indigenous inhabitants are villainous. Thornhill dreams of a life of dignity and entitlement, manifested in his desire to own land. After befriending Blackwood under his employ, Thornhill finds a patch of land he believes will meet his needs, but his past comes back to haunt him. His interactions with the Aboriginal people progress from fearful first encounters to (after careful observation) appreciation. The desire for him to own the land contrasts with his wife wanting to return to England. The clash is one between a group of people desperate for land and another for whom the concept of ownership is bewildering.

A decade later, and William Thornhill becomes the wealthiest man in the area. He builds his own house, but he has always felt that something felt off. He also bought a new boat, named "Sarah" and renamed "Darkey's Creek" to "Thornhill's Point." Long Jack continued to stay, at Thornhill's Point, when all the other natives had fled. Thornhill's son, Dick, leaves him to live with Blackwood, and Thornhill's friendship with Blackwood also deteriorates, which leads Thornhill to have a sense of guilt of his actions.

Searching for the Secret River
Grenville followed up The Secret River with a non-fiction book titled Searching for the Secret River in which she describes both the research she undertook into the history behind the book and her writing process. She chronicles how she changed from her original plan of writing a non-fiction book about her great-great-great-grandfather, Solomon Wiseman, to writing a fictional work.

Use in curricula
The Secret River is a text used for the Victorian Certificate of Education Year 12 English course. It is also used for the Western Australian TEE course through Secondary school. The University of Sydney distributed 9,500 copies of The Secret River to enrolling first-year students in January 2011 as part of the inaugural 'First-Year Book Club', which aims to bring students together to discuss and debate big ideas around a common theme. 
As a "set text" it is included in the IGCSE (Grade 9 & 10) English Literature course for 2017–19. 
As a text used for Close Text analysis, The Secret River  is included in the Tasmanian Certificate of Education (TCE) English Level 3 course.

Awards and nominations
FAW Christina Stead Award, 2005: joint winner
Commonwealth Writers Prize, South East Asia and South Pacific Region, Best Book, 2006: winner
Commonwealth Writers Prize, 2006: winner
Miles Franklin Literary Award, 2006: shortlisted
New South Wales Premier's Literary Awards, Community Relations Commission Award, 2006: winner
New South Wales Premier's Literary Awards, Christina Stead Prize for Fiction, 2006: winner
Nita Kibble Literary Award, 2006: shortlisted
Booksellers Choice Award, 2006: winner
Australian Book Industry Awards (ABIA), Australian Book of the Year, 2006: winner
Australian Book Industry Awards (ABIA), Australian Literary Fiction Book of the Year, 2006: winner
The Age Book of the Year Award, Fiction Prize, 2006: shortlisted
Booker Prize, 2006: shortlisted
Queensland Premier's Literary Awards, Best Fiction Book, 2006: shortlisted
Victorian Premier's Literary Award, The Vance Palmer Prize for Fiction, 2006: shortlisted
Colin Roderick Award, 2005: shortlisted
International Dublin Literary Award, 2007: longlisted

References

External links
Podcast of Kate Grenville discussing The Secret River on the BBC's World Book Club
Kate Grenville literary papers mainly relating to The Secret River (2005), 1981–2006 at the State Library of NSW

2005 Australian novels
Australian historical novels
Novels set in New South Wales
Fiction set in 1806
Text Publishing books